The Boise River and Canal Bridge, in Caldwell, Idaho, is a three-span,  Warren camelback through-truss design constructed in 1922 by the American Bridge Company from plans submitted by Caldwell city engineer Fred H. McConnel. The site is where Oregon Trail pioneers forded the Boise River. The bridge was listed on the National Register of Historic Places in 2007.

The Boise River and Canal Bridge replaced an earlier bridge known as the Canyon Hill Bridge, and when the new bridge was commissioned by Canyon County officials, it continued under the same name. Later, the bridge became known as Idaho Pacific Highway Bridge, Highway 30 Bridge, or Silver Bridge.

These factors and that the bridge is beyond its functional lifespan have prompted Canyon County officials to consider refurbishing the Boise River and Canal Bridge as a pedestrian only bridge and building a new bridge for motorized traffic near the site.

References

External links

		
National Register of Historic Places in Canyon County, Idaho
Bridges on the National Register of Historic Places in Idaho
Bridges completed in 1922